Kulkani Rural District is a rural district (dehestan) in Majin District, Darreh Shahr County, Ilam Province, Iran. At the 2006 census, its population was 1,719, in 310 families.  The rural district has 7 villages.

References 

Rural Districts of Ilam Province
Darreh Shahr County